Turrilatirus lautus is a species of sea snail, a marine gastropod mollusk in the family Fasciolariidae, the spindle snails, the tulip snails and their allies.

Description

Distribution

References

  Lyons W.G. & Snyder M.A. (2015). New species of Latirus (Montfort, 1810) and taxa with which they have been confused (Gastropoda: Fasciolariidae: Persterniinae). Novapex. 16(2): 33-48

External links
 Reeve, L. A. (1847). Monograph of the genus Turbinella. In: Conchologia Iconica, or, illustrations of the shells of molluscous animals, vol. 4, pl. 1-13 and unpaginated text. L. Reeve & Co., London

Fasciolariidae
Gastropods described in 1847